Rostorp is a neighbourhood of Malmö, situated in the borough of Kirseberg, Malmö Municipality, Skåne County, Sweden. Rostorp is a sub-area containing mainly villas, with its residential buildings mostly built between 1992 and 1993. It is situated west of Östra Fäladsgatan, surrounded by Kirsebergsstaden and south-east of Lundavägen.

In Rostorp there is a preschool named Rostorps preschool. A now-closed prison, Anstalten Rostorp, was located within the previously closed mental hospital named Östra Sjukhuset, which is east of the residential area.

References

 :sv:Rostorp

Neighbourhoods of Malmö